The 1987 Cupa României Final was the 49th final of Romania's most prestigious football cup competition. It was disputed between Steaua București and Dinamo București, and was won by Steaua București after a game with only one goal. It was the 15th cup for Steaua București.

Route to the final

Match details

See also
List of Cupa României finals

References

External links
Romaniansoccer.ro

1987
Cupa
Romania
FC Steaua București matches